Tatsuya Wakinaga (born 7 January 1965) is a Japanese sailor. He competed at the 1984 Summer Olympics and the 1988 Summer Olympics.

References

External links
 

1965 births
Living people
Japanese male sailors (sport)
Olympic sailors of Japan
Sailors at the 1984 Summer Olympics – Flying Dutchman
Sailors at the 1988 Summer Olympics – Flying Dutchman
Place of birth missing (living people)
Sailors at the 1986 Asian Games
Medalists at the 1986 Asian Games
Asian Games bronze medalists for Japan
Asian Games medalists in sailing